The 1987 Tulane Green Wave football team was an American football team that represented Tulane University during the 1987 NCAA Division I-A football season as an independent. In their third year under head coach Mack Brown, the team compiled a 6–6 record and lost to Washington at the Independence Bowl.

Schedule

Roster

References

Tulane
Tulane Green Wave football seasons
Tulane Green Wave football